Kernel Independent Transport Layer (KITL) is an interface in Microsoft WinCE  "designed to provide an easy way for you to support any debugging service".

References 

Windows CE